California's 42nd State Assembly district is one of 80 California State Assembly districts. It is currently represented by Independent Chad Mayes of Yucca Valley.

District profile 
The district straddles the gateway between the Inland Empire and the California desert, stretching from Yucaipa and Hemet in the west to the Twentynine Palms region and western Coachella Valley in the east.

Riverside County – 15.4%
 Banning
 Beaumont
 Cabazon
 Calimesa
 Cherry Valley
 Hemet – 61.7%
 Indian Wells
 La Quinta
 Palm Desert
 Palm Springs
 Rancho Mirage
 San Jacinto
 Whitewater

San Bernardino County – 6.2%
 Joshua Tree
 Landers
 Morongo Valley
 Twentynine Palms
 Yucaipa
 Yucca Valley

Election results from statewide races

List of Assembly Members
Due to redistricting, the 42nd district has been moved around different parts of the state. The current iteration resulted from the 2011 redistricting by the California Citizens Redistricting Commission.

Election results 1992 - present

2020

2018

2016

2014

2012

2010

2008

2006

2004

2002

2000

1998

1996

1994

1992

See also 
 California State Assembly
 California State Assembly districts
 Districts in California

References

External links 
 District map from the California Citizens Redistricting Commission

42
Government of San Bernardino County, California
Assembly
Coachella Valley
Inland Empire
Banning, California
Beaumont, California
Cabazon, California
Calimesa, California
Hemet, California
Indian Wells, California
Joshua Tree National Park
Palm Desert, California
Palm Springs, California
Rancho Mirage, California
Twentynine Palms, California
Yucaipa, California
Yucca Valley, California